Placothelium is a genus of lichenized fungi in the family Verrucariaceae. A monotypic genus, it contains the single species Placothelium staurothelioides.

References

External links
Index Fungorum

Verrucariales
Lichen genera
Monotypic Ascomycota genera
Taxa named by Johannes Müller Argoviensis